The 2017 Japan Women's Open (also known as the 2017 Hashimoto Sogyo Japan Women's Open for sponsorship reasons) was a women's tennis tournament played on outdoor hard courts. It was the ninth edition of the Japan Women's Open, and part of the WTA International tournaments of the 2017 WTA Tour. It was held at the Ariake Coliseum in Tokyo, Japan, from September 11 through September 17, 2017.

Point distribution

Prize money

1 Qualifiers prize money is also the Round of 32 prize money
2 Per team

Singles main-draw entrants

Seeds

 Rankings are as of August 28, 2017

Other entrants
The following players received wildcards into the singles main draw:
  Kimiko Date 
  Kristina Mladenovic 
  Kristýna Plíšková

The following player received entry using a protected ranking:
  Misa Eguchi

The following players received entry from the qualifying draw:
  Zarina Diyas 
  Jana Fett 
  Miyu Kato 
  Danka Kovinić

Withdrawals
Before the tournament
  Lauren Davis → replaced by  Jana Čepelová
  Magdaléna Rybáriková → replaced by  Sara Sorribes Tormo
  Kateřina Siniaková → replaced by  Kurumi Nara
  Natalia Vikhlyantseva → replaced by  Richèl Hogenkamp
  Donna Vekić → replaced by  Han Xinyun
  Markéta Vondroušová → replaced by  Aliaksandra Sasnovich
  Zheng Saisai → replaced by  Hsieh Su-wei

Doubles main-draw entrants

Seeds

1 Rankings are as of August 28, 2017

Other entrants
The following pairs received wildcards into the doubles main draw:
  Chuang Chia-jung /  Misaki Doi
  Erina Hayashi /  Momoko Kobori

Champions

Singles

  Zarina Diyas def.  Miyu Kato, 6–2, 7–5

Doubles

  Shuko Aoyama /  Yang Zhaoxuan def.  Monique Adamczak /  Storm Sanders, 6–0, 2–6, [10–5]

External links

 
Japan Women's Open
Japan Women's Open
Japan Women's Open
September 2017 sports events in Japan
2017 in Japanese tennis